Jennifer Tilly (born Jennifer Ellen Chan; September 16, 1958) is an American–Canadian actress and poker player. Known for her distinctive voice and comedic timing, she has been nominated for an Academy Award, two MTV Movie Awards and three Saturn Awards.

Tilly had her breakthrough playing Olive Neal in the black comedy film Bullets Over Broadway (1994), which earned her a nomination for the Academy Award for Best Supporting Actress. She subsequently earned Saturn Award and MTV Award nominations for her performance in the neo-noir thriller Bound (1996). She rose to widespread recognition for playing Tiffany Valentine in the slasher film franchise Child's Play (1998–present), which established her as an icon in popular culture and a scream queen. Since 1999, Tilly has voiced Bonnie Swanson on the animated comedy series Family Guy.

Tilly's other film appearances include Let It Ride (1989), The Fabulous Baker Boys (1989), Made in America (1993), The Getaway (1994), Edie & Pen (1996), House Arrest (1996), Liar Liar (1997), Music from Another Room (1998), Stuart Little (1999), Dancing at the Blue Iguana (2000), The Cat's Meow (2001),  Monsters, Inc. (2001), The Haunted Mansion (2003), Home on the Range (2004), and Tideland (2005). Her stage credits include the Broadway revivals of The Women (2001) and Don't Dress for Dinner (2012). She was the recipient of a Theatre World Award in 1993 for her performance in the Off-Broadway play One Shoe Off.  

Tilly is a World Series of Poker Ladies' Event bracelet winner, the first celebrity to win a World Series tournament. In 2005, she won the third World Poker Tour Ladies Invitational Tournament. She was nominated for PokerListing's Spirit of Poker Living Legend Award in 2014, and as of 2019, her live tournament winnings exceeded $1 million.

Early life
Tilly was born Jennifer Ellen Chan in Harbor City, Los Angeles. She is the first daughter of Harry Chan, a used car salesman, and Patricia (née Tilly), a Canadian schoolteacher and former stage actress. Her father was of Chinese descent and her mother was of Irish and Finnish ancestry. She has an older brother, Steve, and two younger sisters, Meg and Rebecca.

Following her parents' divorce when she was five, Tilly was raised by her mother and stepfather, John Ward, on rural Texada Island in British Columbia. According to her sister Meg, Ward was a sadistic pedophile.
Her sister Becky agreed but Jennifer did not comment on the issue.
Her mother divorced again when Tilly was 16. The family then moved to Langford, a suburb of Victoria, British Columbia, where Tilly attended Belmont Secondary School. 

During her high school years, she developed an interest in theater, which prompted her to actively participate in plays as an extra with the assistance of her mother. Tilly holds a bachelor's degree in theater from Stephens College in Missouri.

Acting career
In 1983, Tilly had small roles and had a recurring guest role on Hill Street Blues as Gina Srignoli, a mobster's widow who becomes romantically involved with detective Henry Goldblume. She played Frasier Crane's seductive-but-ditzy date Candi Pearson on an episode of the fourth season of Cheers and appeared as a similar character on the eleventh season of Frasier.

She appeared as Garry's girlfriend on It's Garry Shandling's Show, which aired on Showtime. She was also cast as a high-end prostitute on the short-lived comedy Key West, alongside Fisher Stevens. In 1989, she had a prominent role in the comedy Let It Ride, starring Richard Dreyfuss. Tilly's breakthrough film role was short but memorable appearance as a waitress who fails miserably when auditioning to be a singer in The Fabulous Baker Boys, a role that was written specially for her by Steve Kloves. She was nominated for an Academy Award for Best Supporting Actress for her role as Olive Neal, a hopelessly bad actress in Woody Allen's Bullets Over Broadway but she lost to her co-star Dianne Wiest. In 1994, she also had a small role in The Getaway with Alec Baldwin and Kim Basinger.

Tilly starred in Bound (1996), directed by The Wachowskis, which portrays a lesbian relationship her character has with Gina Gershon. She played Samantha Cole in the Jim Carrey comedy Liar Liar (1997). In Dancing at the Blue Iguana (2000), she played a stripper and part-time dominatrix. She portrayed gossip columnist Louella Parsons in the Peter Bogdanovich historical drama The Cat's Meow (2001).

She gained additional popularity around that time for her portrayal of serial killer Tiffany Valentine in several of the Child's Play horror movie series. The character was first introduced in the fourth installment of the franchise, Bride of Chucky (1998), and subsequently appeared in Seed of Chucky (2004), Curse of Chucky (2013), Cult of Chucky (2017), and the television series Chucky (2021). In Seed of Chucky, she plays a dual role, providing the voice for Tiffany and also playing an exaggerated version of herself. The performance earned her nominations for the Fangoria Chainsaw Award for Best Actress and the MTV Movie Award for Best Scared-As-Shit Performance. She reprises the role in every subsequent appearance.

In 2001, she starred as Crystal Allen in the Broadway revival of The Women.  In 2002 she played Fanny Minafer in the made-for-TV remake of Orson Welles' The Magnificent Ambersons.

She is a semi-regular cast member on Family Guy, voicing the Griffin family's neighbor, Bonnie Swanson. She has also done voice-over work for the films Monsters, Inc., Stuart Little and Home on the Range, as well as the children's series Hey Arnold!. In Disney's The Haunted Mansion, she portrays Madame Leota (a head in a crystal ball). She has been active in the theatre, winning a Theater World Award for her performance in the off-Broadway play One Shoe Off.

She had a starring role on the sitcom Out of Practice, which starred Henry Winkler and Stockard Channing. The series was cancelled in May 2006. About this time, Tilly started dividing her time between her film career and professional poker. By the end of 2008, she returned to her film and television career. In 2009, Tilly made her Chinese film debut in the Christina Yao film Empire of Silver playing Mrs. Landdeck.

In 2012, she returned to Broadway in Don't Dress for Dinner, garnering an Audience Choice Award nomination for her portrayal of mistress Suzanne. In 2013, she starred in the Wallace Shawn/Andre Gregory collaboration Grasses of a Thousand Colors which premiered at the Royal Court Theatre in London in 2009 and then moved to the Joseph Papp Theater in 2013. She regularly appeared in the comedy revue Celebrity Autobiography.

Poker career 

Tilly's father was a gambler and a poker player, and gave her the video game World Series of Poker. She was subsequently taught the real game by her boyfriend when she moved to Hollywood.

On June 27, 2005, Tilly won a World Series of Poker bracelet (and $158,625) in the Ladies' No-Limit Texas hold 'em event, beating 600 other players. She followed up this accomplishment on September 1, 2005, by winning the third World Poker Tour Ladies Invitational Tournament held at the Bicycle Casino in Bell Gardens, a suburb of Los Angeles. Tilly has appeared in the GSN Poker Royale series. Tilly played in the Celebrity Poker Showdown which aired June 14, 2006, on Bravo. She came in third place after being beaten by Bravo's online poker champion Ida Siconolfi. She also participated in the Poker After Dark show.

When playing poker on television, Tilly often wears low-cut tops with push-up bras that expose considerable cleavage in order to "look cute", but noted that "if people are really playing poker, they don't care. Nothing looks better to them than a pair of aces. They're not looking at your pair. They're looking at their pair." Tilly appears in the World Series of Poker Tournament of Champions 2007 Edition video game, along with her boyfriend Phil Laak, which was released in 2007 by Activision.

In a television interview in 2005, Tilly stated that at that point in her career she was more interested in pursuing poker than acting. By December 2008, Tilly announced her retirement from poker as a career. In her monthly column in Bluff Magazine, she said: "I love poker but greatness in poker is an elusive dream. There are too many variants. Trying to find validation in poker is like trying to find a virgin in a whorehouse. I'm not giving up poker entirely – gambling is an addiction after all. I'm just going to treat it more like a hobby and less like a career."

In January 2010, she resumed her poker career.

Personal life
Tilly was married to Sam Simon, developer and producer of The Simpsons, from 1984 until 1991. As of 2018, Tilly receives 30 percent of net proceeds  that Simon’s estate receives from Fox. She has been in a relationship with professional poker player Phil Laak since 2004.

Filmography

Film

Television

Web

Video games

Awards and nominations

Acting awards

In addition, she received Drama-Logue Awards for her work in the theater plays Vanities and One Shoe Off.

Poker awards
 World Series of Poker Bracelet: In 2005, Tilly won the $1,000 Ladies' No Limit Hold'em; the prize was $158,335.
 CardPlayer Best Celebrity Player of the Year, 2005
 WPT Ladies Invitational Tournament, 2005 ($25,000)
 WPT Bellagio Cup 5K, 2010 ($124,455)

References

External links

 
 
 
 
 Jennifer Tilly Bio at Tribute.ca

1958 births
20th-century American actresses
21st-century American actresses
Actresses from Los Angeles
American actresses of Chinese descent
American film actresses
American people of Canadian descent
American people of Finnish descent
American people of Irish descent
American poker players
American television actresses
American voice actresses
Canadian actresses of Chinese descent
Canadian people of Finnish descent
Canadian people of Irish descent
Canadian voice actresses
Female poker players
Living people
Stephens College alumni
World Poker Tour winners
World Series of Poker bracelet winners
People from Harbor City, Los Angeles
American stage actresses
Canadian television actresses
Canadian film actresses